Victoria  is a Metropolitan Borough of Sefton ward in the Bootle Parliamentary constituency that covers the locality of Great Crosby. The population of this ward at the 2011 census was 13,252.

Councillors

Election results

Elections of the 2020s

Elections of the 2010s

Elections of the 2000s

References

Wards of the Metropolitan Borough of Sefton